Terzo is a comune (municipality) in the Province of Alessandria in the Italian region Piedmont, located about  southeast of Turin and about  southwest of Alessandria.

It was a fortress of the bishop of Acqui, of which only a late medieval tower remains.
Terzo borders the following municipalities: Acqui Terme, Bistagno, Melazzo, and Montabone.

References

Cities and towns in Piedmont